Alan Williams (born November 4, 1969) is an American football coach and former player who is the defensive coordinator for the Chicago Bears of the National Football League (NFL).

College
Between 1988 and 1991, Williams played running back at William & Mary, where he was a teammate of future Pittsburgh Steelers head coach Mike Tomlin. Williams finished his playing career at William & Mary with 1,220 rushing yards and 15 rushing touchdowns, while he totaled 131 receptions for 1,331 yards with 7 scores. As a senior, he led the team in receptions (57) and receiving yards (598).

Coaching career
Williams was an assistant coach from 1992-95 for Norview High School, where he also coached track and field. He returned to William & Mary as a coach in 1996, coaching running backs from 1996–97 and defensive backs from 1998–2000.

Williams got his first NFL coaching experience coaching under Tony Dungy in the Tampa Bay Buccaneers organization in 2001. The next year, Williams followed Tony Dungy to the Indianapolis Colts where he served as the defensive backs coach for the Colts from 2002 to 2011. With the Colts, Williams won Super Bowl XLI against the Chicago Bears.

On January 19, 2012, he was hired to be the defensive coordinator of the Minnesota Vikings.

On January 24, 2014, Williams joined the Detroit Lions defensive coaching staff as the new secondary coach.

In 2018 Williams joined the Indianapolis Colts.

On February 2, 2022, Williams became the defensive coordinator for the Chicago Bears, following newly-appointed head coach Matt Eberflus from the Indianapolis Colts.

Personal life
Williams is a native of Norfolk, Virginia. With his wife Lisa, he has three children—Christian, Solomon, and Nathan.

References

External links
 Indianapolis Colts bio

1969 births
Living people
Indianapolis Colts coaches
Minnesota Vikings coaches
National Football League defensive coordinators
Sportspeople from Norfolk, Virginia
Players of American football from Norfolk, Virginia
Tampa Bay Buccaneers coaches
William & Mary Tribe football players
William & Mary Tribe football coaches
High school football coaches in Virginia
High school track and field coaches in the United States
Chicago Bears coaches